Tiella is a dish in Italian cuisine that is prepared with potato, rice, onion and mussels as primary ingredients. Additional ingredients may be used. Variations of the dish exist, and some may be prepared with other types of seafood. The round earthenware dish in which tiella is traditionally cooked is also referred to as a "tiella". Tiella is part of the cuisine of Apulia in southern Italy. It may also be found in coastal areas of Calabria.

In Gaeta, Lazio, Italy, tiella is a specialty dish of the region prepared in the style of a pocket sandwich, using seafood such as octopus that is stuffed within a torta. Some other Italian dishes also referred to as "tiella" include a casserole and a stew.

Origin
In Italy, the dish originated during the time of Spanish rule in southern Italy, and it has been described as being "reminiscent of Spanish rule". Waverly Root described tiella as "one of the few Spanish dishes which have been taken into the Italian repertory" and considered it was distantly related to paella. Potatoes entered Italian cuisine during the 16th century, a time of powerful Spanish influence in the peninsula.

Tiella with potato, rice, onion and mussels

Ingredients and preparation
Primary ingredients used in this dish are potato, rice, onion, and mussels. Additional ingredients used in its preparation may include tomato, artichoke, courgettes, garlic, white wine, celery, parsley, bread crumbs and cheese, such as Pecorino. It is typically baked in an oven, and has been described as similar in appearance to paella. Some versions omit the use of rice. The mussels are "traditionally served on the half shell", and may be steamed prior to being added to the dish for baking.

Tiella has been described as a "hearty dish", typical of the regional cooking of Apulia. Fresh vegetables from this region may be used in tiella's preparation there. Apulian tiella typically includes a significant amount of potatoes. Tiella has also been described as a casserole.

The dish may be cooked in a terracotta or earthenware glazed ceramic round dish that is also called a "tiella". Contemporary preparations may be cooked in metal pans.

Variations
Apulian versions of the dish may use rice and potato, along with white wine to steam the mussels in, Pecorino cheese, bread crumbs and parsley.

Some versions may be prepared with other types of seafood, such as sardines.

Other types
Italian dishes also referred to as tiella include an Abruzzan potato and eggplant casserole and an Apulian stew named Tiella di Agnello that is prepared with lamb, potato and onion. Both of these dishes may also be cooked in an earthenware tiella dish. Tiella di Agnello is typically prepared by placing all of the raw ingredients in the tiella dish in layers, which results in the top layer being crispy, while the bottom layer is soft and has liquids that have settled.

See also

 List of Italian dishes
 List of potato dishes
 List of rice dishes

References

Sources

Italian cuisine
Cuisine of Abruzzo
Cuisine of Lazio
Cuisine of Apulia
Rice dishes
Potato dishes